Just Cause may refer to:

 Just cause (employment law), a common standard in United States labor arbitration, and a reason for termination of employment.
 Just Cause (film), a 1995 legal thriller starring Sean Connery
 Just Cause (TV series), a 2000s Canadian legal drama
 Just Cause (video game series), a video game series
 Just Cause (video game), the first entry of the series, released in 2006
 Operation Just Cause, the 1989 U.S. invasion of Panama

See also
Just war theory, a doctrine of military ethics
Right Cause (disambiguation)
Strike for cause, a jury-selection procedure
Just Because (disambiguation)